Ernest Earl "Jimmy" Walker (December 18, 1915 – June 27, 1990) was an American country musician.

Biography
Although relatively little has been written about Jimmy Walker, he ranks as an important figure in the development of country music. Not only did he record the first version of the country standard "Detour" in 1945, but to date he is the only man who ever replaced Roy Acuff on the Grand Ole Opry. He also recorded numerous other outstanding western swing-honky tonk numbers, appeared as a regular on Midwestern Hayride, WWVA Jamboree and Louisiana Hayride, and appeared in several motion pictures.

Born Ernest E. Walker in Mason County, West Virginia on December 18, 1915, "Jimmy" did not opt for a regular musical career until the mid-forties. By this time, he had relocated to the West Coast which then was a booming region for country dance music. At his first record session he waxed the hit song "Detour." The song's author, Paul Westmoreland, played steel guitar on the recording. A year later, Grand Ole Opry officials hired him to replace Roy Acuff who took an extended leave. At the time, they were much impressed not only with "Detour" but also "Sioux City Sue" and a fine heart song entitled "Oh Why." Unfortunately for Jimmy, Roy Acuff chose to return to the Opry after a year. His recordings during that period (1945–47), all made in Los Angeles, featured such name musicians as Noel Boggs on steel guitar, Tex Atchison on fiddle, Cliffie Stone on bass, and Merle Travis on lead guitar.

Meanwhile, Jimmy Walker moved on to serve stints of roughly a year and a half each on WLW Cincinnati's Midwestern Hayride and WWVA Wheeling's "World's Original Jamboree." In 1949, he returned to California and made some more recordings for another independent label. These sessions again featured Atchison and also Joe Maphis on lead guitar and Speedy West on steel. Other musicians who appeared in Walker sessions included Pedro DePaul and George Bamby on accordions (both veterans of the Spade Cooley band), and guitarist Charlie Morgan, the brother of pop vocal star Jaye P. Morgan. By 1951, he had done some twenty-eight sides. Later in the decade, he had sessions for two major labels and another independent studio visit in 1965. All are fine examples of the mainstream honky-tonk sound that dominated the country field before the rise of the Nashville sound. Meanwhile, Walker returned to the WWVA Jamboree in 1953 remaining for more than a decade. During this time one of his songs "Unkind Words" recorded by Jamobree vocalist Kathy Dee made the "Billboard Top 20" in 1964, but as is often the case, the royalties never reached him.

In the mid-sixties, Jimmy Walker returned to California to work as a country singer and motion picture actor. One of the better-known films in which he played a character role was the Lee Marvin - Clint Eastwood picture, "Paint Your Wagon." Retiring in the late 1970s, Walker came back to his boyhood home in Mason County, West Virginia, but continued to play many clubs and other show dates and kept up contacts with old show biz pals like the late Tex Atchison and Merle Travis.  He died in 1990.

In a sense, Jimmy Walker seems to parallel the saying about the lady who was "always a bridesmaid and never a bride." When one of his recordings would begin to take off, Columbia or Victor would rush a "cover" onto the market by a Spade Cooley or an Eddy Arnold respectively, and overshadow his efforts. Hired as a featured act on the Opry, he found himself back on the outside when superstar Roy Acuff chose to exercise his option to return. When Capitol Records sought Walker as a replacement for a dying Jack Guthrie in 1947, he could not get out of his contract with a smaller firm. When he finally got on a major label in 1953, his company pushed its one superstar and neglected the other fine country acts on its talent roster. Yet in another sense, all of the above-mentioned facts attest to Walker's importance, even if they worked to his disadvantage. This album is a modest effort to display the talent of one of the finest country singers of his era. While researching my history of West Virginia country music, old acquaintances of Walker such as Lee Moore, Slim Clere, and Doc Williams all told me that data on Jimmy Walker must certainly be included. I had barely heard of the man and somewhat surprisingly found that he lived less than fifty miles from my home and less than twenty miles from my workplace. I looked him up and I'm glad that I did. He proved to be a fine gentleman with a head full of knowledge. When the modern country sounds first began to appear in the decade from 1945, Ernest E. Walker was not only a witness to much of the action, but he was also indeed a part of the action!

References

External links
  Discography
  
  

1915 births
1990 deaths
American country singer-songwriters
20th-century American singers